Pont-Audemer is a commune in the Eure department in the Normandy region in northern France. On 1 January 2018, the former commune of Saint-Germain-Village was merged into Pont-Audemer.

Geography
The commune is situated on the river Risle, 13 km upstream from its outflow into the Seine. It lies on the border between the regions Roumois and Lieuvin.

Population
The population data in the table below refer to the commune of Pont-Audemer proper, in its geography at the given years. The commune of Pont-Audemer absorbed part of the former commune of Saint-Agnan in 1835, Saint-Paul-sur-Risle in 1963 and Saint-Germain-Village in 2018.

Sights
The commune was spared substantial damage to its historic buildings during the Battle of Normandy. Nowadays the half-timbered buildings and the canals running between them are a tourist attraction. The church of Saint-Ouen is noted for its Renaissance stained glass.

Personalities
Laetitia Casta, supermodel, was born there in 1978.
Hervé Morin, politician, former  French Minister of Defence was born there in 1961.
Alexis Vastine, boxer, was born there in 1986.

Transport
Pont-Audemer has a railway station, Gare de Pont-Audemer, but passenger services were ceased in 1969. The station is served by TER Haute-Normandie buses. PontAuRail, a heritage railway association, ran two Diesel multiple units (a X4500 and a X2400) from Pont-Audemer to Honfleur between 1995 and 2006.

Administration
Until 1926, Pont-Audemer was a sub-prefecture of the Eure department.

Media
The city is evoked in a poem of Paul Verlaine called "The Apollo of Pont-Audemer."
The area is included in Ted Fahrenwald's book "Bailout Over Normandy: A Flyboy's Adventures" as the site where he met Riri, his sweetheart.

Twin towns - sister cities
Pont-Audemer is twinned with:
 Ringwood in England
 Veghel in the Netherlands

Gallery

See also
Communes of the Eure department

References

Communes of Eure